Statistics of Nemzeti Bajnokság I in the 1948–49 season.

Overview
It was contested by 16 teams, and Ferencvárosi TC won the championship.

League standings

Results

Statistical leaders

Top goalscorers

References
Hungary - List of final tables (RSSSF)

Nemzeti Bajnokság I seasons
Hun
1948–49 in Hungarian football